Moinuddin (born 20 September 1987) is a Pakistani first-class cricketer who plays for Multan cricket team.

References

External links
 

1987 births
Living people
Pakistani cricketers
Multan cricketers
Cricketers from Bahawalpur